Klementyevo is a rural locality (a village) in Razdolyevskoye Rural Settlement, Kolchuginsky District, Vladimir Oblast, Russia. The population was 6 as of 2010. There are two streets.

Geography 
Klementyevo is located 25 km southeast of Kolchugino (the district's administrative centre) by road. Pavlovka is the nearest rural locality.

References 

Rural localities in Kolchuginsky District